Louis Combet (1927–2004) was a French scholar of Spanish language and culture with a special expertise on the study of proverbs. Combet was also an authority on the work of Cervantes.

Combet was a professor at the University of Lyon. He bequeathed his private library of Spanish literature, containing works on the Spanish Golden Age, Cervantes and the study of proverbs ("Paremiología"), to the Instituto Cervantes de Lyon.

1927 births
2004 deaths
Cervantists